Subtropical Cyclone Katie, unofficially named by researchers, was an unusual weather event in early 2015. After the 2014–15 South Pacific cyclone season had officially ended, a rare subtropical cyclone was identified outside of the basin near Easter Island, during early May, and was unofficially dubbed Katie by researchers. Katie was one of the few tropical or subtropical systems ever observed forming in the far Southeast Pacific, outside of the official basin boundary of 120°W, which marks the eastern edge of RSMC Nadi's and RSMC Wellington's warning areas, during the satellite era. Due to the fact that this storm developed outside of the official areas of responsibility of the warning agencies in the South Pacific, the storm was not officially included as a part of the 2014–15 South Pacific cyclone season. However, the Chilean Navy Weather Service issued High Seas Warnings on the system as an extratropical low.

Meteorological history

On April 29, 2015, near the end of the 2014–15 South Pacific cyclone season, an extratropical disturbance developed in the far Southeastern Pacific, before transitioning into a subtropical depression soon afterward. The storm transitioned into a subtropical depression at 102.9°W, well to the east of the South Pacific basin's eastern boundary of 120°W. Around this time, the Chilean Navy Weather Service began including the storm in their High Seas Warnings, continuing this until May 4. During the next couple of days, the system drifted to the southwest, before turning to the southeast. On May 1, the storm intensified into a subtropical cyclone of tropical storm intensity, and looped westward. Around this time, the storm was identified by researchers and unofficially named Katie. During the next day, Katie slowly tracked westward while gradually weakening. On May 4, Katie weakened into a subtropical depression and began accelerating to the northwest, passing to the east of Easter Island, before weakening further into a remnant low. With this degeneration, the Chilean Navy Weather Service ceased issuing warnings on the storm. On May 6, Katie's remnant low dissipated. During Katie's entire existence, the storm remained east of 120°W, outside of the South Pacific basin's official boundary.

Records
Subtropical Cyclone Katie is unofficially the second-easternmost tropical or subtropical cyclone ever observed to form in the South Pacific Ocean, transitioning into a subtropical system near 102.9°W. This broke the previous record of around 110°W, set by a tropical depression in May 1983. "Katie" was also the first tropical or subtropical system to form east of the South Pacific basin's official eastern boundary of 120°W since another tropical depression in May 1983. However, in May 2018, Katie's record was broken by Subtropical Cyclone Lexi, which formed just a few hundred miles off the coast of Chile, near 80°W. Tropical cyclogenesis is extremely rare in the far southeastern Pacific Ocean, due to the cold sea-surface temperatures generated by the Humboldt Current, lack of tropical disturbance formation, and also due to unfavorable wind shear; as such, there are no records of a tropical cyclone impacting western South America. Although Katie's observed characteristics were consistent with that of a subtropical cyclone, detailed analysis revealed that the storm may have briefly transitioned into a tropical cyclone, around the time of its peak intensity.

Notes

See also

Other storms of the same name
Subtropical Cyclone Lexi
Subtropical Cyclone Humberto
2006 Central Pacific cyclone
Subtropical Storm 96C
Hurricane Catarina
Tropical Storm Rolf
Cyclone Qendresa
Cyclone Numa
Cyclone Ianos
1996 Lake Huron cyclone
Mediterranean tropical-like cyclone
South Atlantic tropical cyclone
1982–83 South Pacific cyclone season – Saw a tropical depression developing east of 120°W
2017–18 South Pacific cyclone season
Tropical cyclogenesis
El Niño–Southern Oscillation

References

External links
Unofficial track data from Australia Severe Weather
TROPICAL CYCLONE OPERATIONAL PLAN FOR THE SOUTH PACIFIC AND SOUTH-EAST INDIAN OCEAN: 2014 Edition

2014–15 South Pacific cyclone season
April 2015 events in South America
May 2015 events in South America
April 2015 events in Oceania
May 2015 events in Oceania
2015 in Chile
Subtropical cyclones
Subtropical storms
Cyclones in South America
Katie